Chris Ratay and Erin Doherty-Ratay are American long-distance motorcyclists. Their , four year circumnavigation of the Earth on BMW F650 and BMW R100PD motorcycles between May 1999 and August 2003 set a new Guinness World Record for distance ridden by a pair of motorcyclists on two motorcycles.

The couple have appeared on U.S. national live television on NBC News, and the 2012 documentary DVD Achievable Dream: The Motorcycle Adventure Guide. Erin Ratay is one of the subjects of the 2013 PBS documentary film Driven to Ride.  Erin Ratay also was a speaker at the American Motorcyclist Association's 2009 Women & Motorcycling Conference in Keystone, Colorado.

Notes and references

Notes

References

Further reading

External links

Living people
Long-distance motorcycle riders
People from Boulder, Colorado
Year of birth missing (living people)